Belorechensky (masculine), Belorechenskaya (feminine), or Belorechenskoye (neuter) is the name of several inhabited localities in Russia.

Urban localities
Belorechensky, Irkutsk Oblast, a work settlement in Usolsky District of Irkutsk Oblast

Rural localities
Belorechensky, Arkhangelsk Oblast, a settlement in Dvinskoy Selsoviet of Verkhnetoyemsky District of Arkhangelsk Oblast
Belorechensky, Ryazan Oblast, a settlement in Zanino-Pochinkovsky Rural Okrug of Shilovsky District of Ryazan Oblast
Belorechensky, Stavropol Krai, a settlement under the administrative jurisdiction of the city of krai significance of Kislovodsk, Stavropol Krai
Belorechensky, Sverdlovsk Oblast, a settlement in Beloyarsky District of Sverdlovsk Oblast
Belorechensky, Volgograd Oblast, a settlement in Krasnoarmeysky Selsoviet of Novonikolayevsky District of Volgograd Oblast
Belorechensky, Voronezh Oblast, a khutor in Bolshedmitrovskoye Rural Settlement of Podgorensky District of Voronezh Oblast